Frassineto may refer to:

 Frassineto Po, comune in the Province of Alessandria in the Italian region Piedmont
 Frassineto, site of Muslim fortress in Provence 
 Frassineto, hamlet of Arezzo